Prudence Risley Residential College for the Creative and Performing Arts, commonly known as Risley Residential College, Risley Hall,  or just Risley, is a program house (themed residence hall) at Cornell University. Unlike most other dormitories on campus, Risley is a residential college; house members, or "Risleyites," have some say in the administration of the residence hall, can continue to reside there as long as they are enrolled at Cornell, are encouraged to eat together at the in-house dining hall, and participate in educational activities such as guest lectures within the dormitory. 

The building houses 192 students, chosen by Risleyites from a number of applications, as well as one or two Artists-In-Residence ("AIRs"), who live in the building and organize regular programs in which the house members participate. The current Artist-In-Residence is Georgia O'Neil. Previous AIRs include Patrick Gray, Carolina Osorio-Gill, Natalie Tyler, Abraham Burickson, Gregory Halpern, and Brandon Bird. Many famous people have visited the house for intimate discussions with the Risleyites, such as Anthony Rapp, Christopher Hogwood, John Cleese, who hosted a question and answer session after the showing of his film A Fish Called Wanda, and Samuel R. Delany who continues to collaborate with Risley alumnus Kenneth James.

History

In 1911, Mrs. Russell Sage donated $300,000 (roughly $7.5M in 2018 adjusted for inflation) to the University for the construction of a women's dormitory.  At her request, the building was named after her husband's mother, Prudence Risley.  The building was opened to students in 1913. It was unusually luxurious, with sculptures and expensive furnishings in common areas, many of which were donated by Cornell co-founder Andrew Dickson White.

In 1970, under the guidance of Ruth Darling, the University converted Risley into a co-ed creative-arts-themed dormitory, the campus's first program house. Judith Goodman had been looking for a house to share with some of her more artistic friends. When she asked Cornell about the house she wanted, they said it had just been given away, but offered Risley instead. The cost of running the fancy all-female dorm was too much, and Cornell was going to shut Risley down.

After several attempts to develop an acceptable plan for running Risley as an arts dorm, and much Cornell paperwork aided by Darling, Goodman and her friends finally got her vision of Risley approved. In the first year, the college received over 1000 applications for the roughly 200 spots in the building.

Their system of government in 1970 is similar to the current one today, though there have been many amendments to the Risley Charter in the intervening years.

Notable former Risley residents from before the creation of Risley Residential College include Margaret Bourke-White<ref>Portrait of Myself' by Margaret Bourke-White, p 30</ref>', Elspeth Huxley, Barbara McClintock, Helen Reichert, and Janet Reno. Notable residents from after the creation of the Residential College include Matt Ruff, Mia Korf, Jamie Silverstein,  Christopher Reeve, Andre Balazs, Madalyn Aslan, Duo Dickinson, Andrew C. Greenberg, David Conte, Jared Emerson-Johnson, Adam Becker, Yoon Ha Lee, Elizabeth Neuffer, and Keith Raywood.

Facilities

As a dormitory, Risley offers a unique living experience.  The Tudor Gothic building itself is shaped like a large red castle, modeled directly on Hampton Court Palace in England. The architect, William H Miller, was requested to design the floor plan such that no two rooms would be identical. Consequently, the rooms vary greatly. Sizes range from a single room that is 93 square feet (9 m²), a former maid's room, to a double room that is 273 square feet (25 m²), the largest double on campus. Room features include balconies, fireplaces, dumbwaiter shafts, secret stairwells, bay windows, embrasures, and turrets. At the request of Andrew Dickson White, the Risley Great Hall was constructed as a smaller scale replica of Oxford's Christ Church's own dining hall. According to campus legend, its gargoyles represent the fourteen stages of botulism.

In order to fulfill its purpose of encouraging creativity, the residence offers a variety of outlets. All residents have access to Risley Theatre (the only fully student-operated theater at Cornell), music practice rooms, pianos, workshops for art, digital music, jewelry, sewing, letterpress, video editing, woodworking, metalworking, stained glass, and pottery, as well as a recording studio, a darkroom, and a small library . Unlike other houses, the affairs of the building are managed by an elected student government, "Kommittee," which determines the budget, use of facilities, and allocation of funds. Kommittee even allows students to paint the interior walls of the building, which has resulted in numerous murals on all the hallways painted by the residents. On many Fridays or Saturdays throughout the school year, the students run a coffee house, "Tammany," where regional bands come to perform. Students have created numerous special interest groups/clubs to meet their interests including a debate society ("The Society for Individualists"), Superhero Club (commonly referred to as Ris-S.H.I.E.L.D.), and a classic video gaming group ("Nintendo Church") among others. Risley has a semi-known secret society, commonly referred to as Fork & Pancake, believed to be a band of mischievous night owls who terrorize the kitchens of the building.

Risley Theatre
Risley Theatre is an 81-seat black box theater built by Risley Residents in a converted ballroom left over from Risley's days as a women's dorm.  Until 1971, it was used to teach dance as a part of the Women's Physical Education program. The seating was added in 1972. It is the only fully student-operated theater on the Cornell campus.

Risley Theatre is run by the Risley Theatre Subcommittee ("T-Sub"), a subcommittee of the governing body of Risley Hall, Kommittee. T-Sub meets weekly in Risley's Central Living Room (CLR). T-Sub is responsible for producing regular seasons in the space, allocating theatre resources, funding student-run productions, and managing the theatre space. Any member of the Ithaca community is eligible to participate in T-Sub.

Risley Theatre has two seasons, based around Cornell's major breaks. Each season is planned out near the end of the previous season during a competitive process called "Play Selection."  Any member of the Cornell and greater Ithaca community may submit proposals for productions during play selection to be included in the upcoming season.  The theatre hosts a wide variety of productions, which have included musical theatre, Shakespearean plays, student works, and comedy groups in the past. Performances are open to anyone, and tickets can be bought at the door.

Traditions

The hall hosts numerous annual events. For example, on the weekend before Halloween, students host a large costumed dance party called MasqueRave. Since 1991, on the weekend following Halloween, an in-house group, the "Denton Drama Troupe," has hosted a live performance of the Rocky Horror Picture Show in the Great Hall. Because both of these events draw hundreds of people, they generate the revenue that supports smaller projects. Other notable events include themed dinners, such as Harry Potter Night, first organized in 2005 by Risley Resident, Charlene Morales, who was at the time a junior in Industrial and Labor Relations.  The event included a menu akin to several beloved dishes, snacks, and drinks such as "butter beer" unique to the Harry Potter film, drawing over 200+ guests.  All dishes were uniquely crafted by kitchen director, Lorna McNab.  The event was so beloved by all that it was then decreed a tradition.  Another notable tradition is the reading of Handel's Messiah.

In addition to annual events, there are also several weekly events (programs), most of which involve free food. Kommittee allocates money every semester to fund events like Eat This!, in which one or more Risleyites cook food for everyone else on Wednesdays at 10:30PM, RisBrunch (RizBrunch), in which one or more Risleyites cook food for everyone else on Saturdays at noon, and Lost Coffee, in which one Risleyite makes coffee and tea, which is placed somewhere in the building along with some cookies, on Monday nights and sends out clues as to where to find it.

Legend says that Prudence Risley, affectionately known as "Auntie Prue," haunts the building, flickering the lights whenever she appears. Some doubt the stories, though, and wonder if these "hauntings" might actually be the result of old wiring and the imaginations of overtired students.

See also
 Hutchinson Hall, University of Chicago, another building with a hall based upon Christ Church's

Risley in literature
 Fool on the Hill by Matt Ruff
 The Salt Point'' by Paul Russell

References

External links

 Risley Hall official website
 The Campus Life Risley Page
 A Risley brochure circa 1976
 The Risley Lexicon
 Risley Theatre
 Virtual Risley Tour
 Picture of Risley in 1919
 360* tour of Christ Church at Oxford.  Risley's Great Hall is a replica of Christ Church's Great Hall.
 a collection of historical Risley photographs
 Freshmen move into Risley in 1960 featured in Life Magazine

Cornell University dormitories
Art schools in New York (state)
William Henry Miller buildings
1913 establishments in New York (state)